Akaki Chachua (born September 16, 1969) is a Georgian wrestler who competed in the Men's Greco-Roman 64 kg at the 2000 Summer Olympics and won the bronze medal. He also competed in the 2004 Summer Olympics and finished 9th.

References

External links
 

1969 births
Living people
People from Samtredia
Wrestlers at the 2000 Summer Olympics
Male sport wrestlers from Georgia (country)
Wrestlers at the 2004 Summer Olympics
Olympic wrestlers of Georgia (country)
Olympic bronze medalists for Georgia (country)
Olympic medalists in wrestling
Medalists at the 2000 Summer Olympics